Eran Riklis (born October 2, 1954) is an Israeli filmmaker. His films include Cup Final (1991), The Syrian Bride (2004), Lemon Tree (2008) and Dancing Arabs (also known as A Borrowed Identity) (2014).

Early life
Riklis was born in Israel in 1954 and lived in Montreal and New York City until he was six, when the family returned to Israel. He served in the Israeli Defense Forces during the Yom Kippur War in 1973 and went to university in Tel Aviv. He graduated from the National Film and Television School in England in 1984, the first Israeli to do so.

Professional career
His first film was the political thriller, On a Clear Day You Can See Damascus (1984). His 1991 film Cup Final 	(Gmar gavi'a) was entered into the Venice International Film Festival (1991), Berlin (1992) and many others.

In 1993, he made the film Zohar, the biggest box office success for an Israeli film in the 1990s, followed by several TV series and by the film Vulcan Junction (1999), which won the Best Film award at the Haifa International Film Festival. In 2004, his film The Syrian Bride, achieved wide international success and won awards including four awards at the Montreal World Film Festival and the Audience Award at the Locarno International Film Festival. In 2008, Lemon Tree won the Audience Award at the Berlin and San Sebastian International Film Festivals and was released globally to critical and commercial success. He and Suha Arraf received the award for Best Screenplay at the 2008 Asia Pacific Screen Awards for Lemon Tree.

His 2010 film The Human Resources Manager, was selected as the Israeli entry for the Best Foreign Language Film at the 83rd Academy Awards, but it didn't make the final shortlist. The film also won the Audience Award again for Riklis at the Locarno film festival (2010).

His adventure thriller film Zaytoun, premiered at the 2012 Toronto International Film Festival and in London as well as many other festivals. It was followed by Dancing Arabs (aka A Borrowed Identity), presented at the Telluride Film Festival, Locarno and many others.

Riklis's 2017 film Shelter, previously titled Refuge, is a spy thriller set mostly in Hamburg. His film, Spider in the Web (2019), starred Ben Kingsley, Monica Bellucci, Itay Tiran and Itzik Cohen. Riklis is preparing his new film Reading Lolita in Tehran, based on the bestseller by Azar Nafisi, that will be shot in late 2020.

Personal life
He is married to Dina Riklis and they have two children, a daughter, Tammy, and a son, Jonathan. The family lives in Tel Aviv.

See also
Cinema of Israel

References

External links

 
 
 

1954 births
Alumni of the National Film and Television School
Israeli film directors
Israeli film producers
Israeli male screenwriters
Living people